Kjøbenhavns Brandforsikring, founded in 1731, was the first Danish provider of fire insurance in Denmark. It existed as an independent enterprise until 1976 and is now part of Tryg. The company's last headquarters was the Gustmeyer House at Ved Stranden 14 in central Copenhagen.

History
The Copenhagen Fire of 1728 devoured around 28% of the buildings in Copenhagen. The merchants Hans Henrik Bech (c. 1699 – 1783) and Hans Hansen Berg (1688–1736) proposed a fire insurance scheme and Kjøbenhavns Brandforsikring was founded by royal resolution on 26 January 1731. The fire insurance was instrumental in speeding up the rebuilding of the city since lending out money for construction projects became less risky. The first  building was insured on 21 December 1731 by Otto Blome at Amagertorv 4.

Kjøbenhavns Brandforsikring was originally only active in the market for fire insurance of buildings located inside the City Walls but from 1889 it gradually opened up for fire insurance on buildings in Frederiksberg and a number of surrounding districts.

The company was based in the Gustmeyer House at Ved Stranden 14 and its last CEO was Frits Pedersen. The company merged with Danmark/Tryg/Fremtiden G/S under the name Tryg Forsikring in 1976.

References

Defunct companies of Denmark
Danish companies established in 1731
Defunct insurance companies